Filippo Baldinucci's Notizie de' Professori del Disegno, Da Cimabue in qua, Secolo V. dal 1610. al 1670. Distinto in Decennali (or Notice of the Professors of Design, from Cimabue to now, from 1610–1670) was a major art biography of Baroque painters. Written by the erudite Florentine professor of the Accademia della Crusca, it is often verbose and rife with factual errors; however, it is a broad compendium of stories about generally contemporaneous Baroque painters.

Dozens of Flemish and Dutch painters, including Rembrandt, were judged to merit inclusion. Though Baldinucci may have met some of these Northern painters on their travels to Italy, the majority of the Dutch and Flemish names he included had biographical notes under portraits engraved by Jan Meyssens, whose work was popular, and whose engravings were reused by Cornelis de Bie for his 1682 book 
Het Gulden Cabinet. Baldinucci included both De Bie (in his father "Adriano de Bie"'s entry) and Meyssens in his book. The posthumous edition (1681) includes (in order of appearance in the text) and expanding list of artists:

Decennale II
Giovanni da S. Giovanni; p. 1
Gio: Lorenzo Bernini; p. 54
Giovanni Bilivert; p. 68
Fra Arsenio Mascagni (Donato Mascagni); p. 79
Agostino Bugiardini; p. 83
Astolfo Petrazzi ; p. 85
Astasio Fontebuoni (Anastasio Fuontebuoni); p. 86
Rutilio Manetti; p. 92
Gherardo Silvani; p. 93
Jacopo Callot; p. 109
Artists from the low countries
Francesco Snyders (Frans Snyders); p. 120
Guglielmo de Nicolant (Willem van Nieulandt II); p. 120
Adamo Willaerts; p. 120
Gasparo Cleayer (Caspar de Crayer); p. 120
Rolando Saveri (Roelant Savery); p. 121
Enrico Van der Borcht (Hendrik van der Borcht the elder); p. 121
Jacopo Ernesto Thoman de Hagelstein; p. 121
Giovanni Stefano Marucelli; p. 122
Giovanni Coccapani; p. 123
Sigismondo Coccapani; p. 132
Chiarisimo d'Antonio Fancelli; p. 136
Orazio Mochi; p. 137
Raffaello Curradi; p. 138
Ottavio Vannini; p. 141
Giovanni Lanfranco; p. 151
Artists from Genoa and its territories
Sinibaldo Scorza; p. 154
Giovanni Andrea Ansaldo; P. 156
Bernardo Strozzi;p. 157
Giovanni Maria Bottala; p. 159
Luciano Di Silvestro Bolzone; p. 159
Giovambatista Capellino (Giovanni Domenico Capellino?)  p. 161

Decennale III
Fra Giovanni Battista Stefaneschi; p. 163
Monsu Giusto Subtermans (Justus Sustermans); p. 167
Michelangelo Cerquozzi; p. 189
Artists from Low Countries
Adriano van Utrecht (Adriaen); p. 197
Giovanni Guglielmo Bawr, (Johann Wilhelm Baur, Strasbourg) ; p. 197
Niccola Canupfer, (Nikolaus Knüpfer) ; p. 197
Jacopo di Giordano or Giacomo Giordans (Jacob Jordaens) ; p. 197
Baldasarr Gerbier, (Balthazar Gerbier) ; p. 197
Lionardo Bramer (Leonaert Bramer) ; p. 197
Adriano de Bie (Adriaan de Bie, father of Cornelis de Bie); p. 198
Adriano Vander Venne, (Adriaen van de Venne) ; p. 198
Gheraldo Honthorst (Gerard van Honthorst) ; p. 198
Pietro Snayers (Peter Snayers) ; p. 198
Jacopo Vrancqaert ; p. 198
Francesco Lauri ; p. 199
Francesco Rustici; p. 200
Snyders D'Anversa, (Frans Snyders); p. 201
Giovambatista Vanni; (Giovanni Battista Vanni); p. 201
Cesare Dandini ; p. 210
Felice Ficherelli ; p. 219
Filippo Uffembach ; p. 226
Orazio Riminaldi ; p. 227
Andrea Camassei ; p. 228
Mario Balassi; p. 233
Cornelio Bloemaert; p. 238
Stefano della Bella ; p. 242
Giovanni Gonelli ; p. 253
Francesco Furini ; p. 258
Girolamo Curti ; p. 267
Cavaliere Gio. Francesco Barbieri, (Giovanni Francesco Barbieri)
Angiol Michele Colonna ; p. 276
Antonio Vandich (Anthony van Dyck) ; p. 279
Francesco Diquesnoy (Francesco Duquesnoy) ; p. 283
Agostino Metelli ; p. 286
Artists from the city of Venice and its territories
Cavaliere Carlo Ridolfi ; p. 289
Marc'Antonio Bassetti (Verona) ; p. 292
Tommaso Sandrino (Brescia); p. 292
Piero Damini, (Pietro Damini, Castelfranco); p. 293
Filippo Zaniberti (Brescia); p. 293
Matteo Ingoli (Ravenna) ; p. 294
Francesco Zugni, (Francesco Zugno, Brescia) ; p. 294
Giovambatista Brisone (Padua) ; p. 295
Tiberio Tinelli
Niccolo Possino (Nicolas Poussin) ; p. 297
Artists from Genoa or Liguria
Giovambatista Carlone ; p. 303
Giovacchino Axereto (Gioacchino Assereto) ; p. 304

Decennale IV
Angiol Maria Colomboni (Angelo Maria Coloboni); p. 305
Cosimo Lotti; p. 306
Baccio del Bianco; p. 311
Alfonso Parigi; p. 332
Alessandro Algardi; p. 235
Pellegrino Piola; p. 338
Antonio Novelli; p. 339
Claudio Gellee; p. 353
Pietro Ricchi; p. 360
Pietro Paolino; p. 364
Cav. Giovanni Miel (Jan Miel); p. 366
Cav. Francesco Borromino; p. 370

Decennale V
Baldassare Franceschini; p. 381
Painters from the low countries
Daniel Segiers (Daniel Seghers; p. 415
Jacopo Van Es (Jacob Foppens van Es); p. 415
Pietro Van Lint (Peter van Lint); p. 415
David Ryckaert (David Ryckaert II); p. 416
Gonsalo Coques (Gonzales Coques); p. 416
Niccola de Helt Stocade (Nicolaes van Helt Stockade); p. 416
Giovambatista Van Deynum (Jan Baptist van Deynum); p. 416
Giorgio Van Son (Joris van Son); p. 416
Giovanni Van Ckesselles (Jan van Kessel, senior); p. 416
Errico Berckmans; p. 416
Gian Filippo Van Thielen (Jan Philips van Thielen); p. 417
Giovanni Peters (or Pietri); p. 417
Padre Jacopo Cortesi; p. 417 (Jacques Courtois)
Alfonso Boschi; p. 426
Prete Francesco Boschi; p. 428
Lorenzo Lippi; p. 450
Roberto Nantevil; p. 461
Gasparo Dughet; p. 473
Reimbrond Vainrein (sic); p. 476, (Rembrandt Van Rijn)
Nicasius Bernaerts; p. 478
Pietro Testa; p. 479
Guobert Flynk; p. 484
Cavaliere Carlo Rainaldi; p. 487
Carlo Dolci; p. 491
Eberhart Keilhau, or Bernhardt Keil or (Monsù Bernardo); p. 510
Ercole Ferrata; p. 516
Pierfrancesco Silvani; p. 528
Artist from Genoa
Francesco Merano (il Paggio); p. 532
Giovambatista Bajardo; p. 533
Giovambattista Mainero; p. 533
Giovampaolo Oderico; p. 533
A. Silvestro Chiesa; p. 534
Giovambatista Monti; p. 534
Orazio da Voltri; p. 534
Gio. Benedetto Castiglione; p. 534 (Giovanni Benedetto Castiglione)
Anton Maria Vassallo (scholar of Vincenzo Malo, pittore Fiammingo); p. 535
Valerio Castello; p. 535
Giulio Benso; p. 536
Antonio Travi, also Antonio da Sestri; p. 536
Piero Andrea Torre; p. 537
Domenico Fiasella da Sarzana; p. 537
Giovanni Andrea de' Ferrari; p. 538
Francesco Capuro; p. 539
Stefano Magnasco; p. 539
Pier Maria Groppallo; p. 539
Gio. Franc. Romanelli; p. 540
Salvatore Rosa; p. 553
Teodoro Helmbrecker (Dirk Helmbreker, Haarlem); p. 592
Livio Mehus
Diacinto Brandi (sic) (Giacinto Brandi); p. 613
Francesco Allegrini; p. 614
Ottaviano Jannella; p. 616

Decennale VII and Part II
Matteo Withoos (Matthias Withoos); p. 622
David Coninche (David Koninck, Antwerp); p. 623
Pietro Boel; p. 624
Pietro van Bredael (Peeter van Bredael); p. 624
Francesco Spierre (François Spierre); p. 625
Cavalieri Fra Mattio Preti; p. 633

External links

Italian art historians
Italian painters by stylistic period
Italian sculptors
Italian architects
Art history books
Baldinucci
1681 books